Canonteign Falls is a waterfall in the historic tything of Canonteign in the Teign Valley and Dartmoor National Park near Chudleigh, South Devon, England.

It was created in 1890 by diverting a stream over the edge of a cliff.

References

Waterfalls of England
Tourist attractions in Devon